In physics, the zitterbewegung ("jittery motion" in German) is the predicted rapid oscillatory motion of elementary particles that obey relativistic wave equations. For the hydrogen atom, zitterbewegung can be invoked as a heuristic way to derive the Darwin term, a small correction of the energy level of the s-orbitals.

Theory

Free fermion
The time-dependent Dirac equation is written as
 
,

,

In the Heisenberg picture, the time dependence of an arbitrary observable  obeys the equation

In particular, the time-dependence of the position operator is given by
.

where  is the position operator at time .

The above equation shows that the operator  can be interpreted as the -th component of a "velocity operator".

Note that this implies that 

,

as if the "root mean square speed" in every direction of space is the speed of light.

.

The time-dependence of the velocity operator is given by
,

where

First:
,

and finally

.

The resulting expression consists of an initial position, a motion proportional to time, and an oscillation term with an amplitude equal to the reduced Compton wavelength. That oscillation term is the so-called zitterbewegung.

Interpretation as an artifact

In quantum mechanics, the zitterbewegung term vanishes on taking expectation values for wave-packets that are made up entirely of positive- (or entirely of negative-) energy waves.  The standard relativistic velocity can be recovered by taking a Foldy–Wouthuysen transformation, when the positive and negative components are decoupled.  Thus, we arrive at the interpretation of the zitterbewegung as being caused by interference between positive- and negative-energy wave components.

In quantum electrodynamics (QED) the negative-energy states are replaced by positron states, and the zitterbewegung is understood as the result of interaction of the electron with spontaneously forming and annihilating electron-positron pairs.

More recently,  it has been noted that in the case of free particles it could just be an artifact of the simplified theory. Zitterbewegung appear as due  to the "small components" of the Dirac 4-spinor, due to a little bit of antiparticle mixed up in the particle wavefunction for a nonrelativistic motion. It doesn't appear in the correct second quantized theory, or rather, it is resolved by using Feynman propagators and doing QED. Nevertheless, it is an interesting way to understand certain QED effects heuristically from the single particle picture.

Experimental simulation 
Zitterbewegung of a free relativistic particle has never been observed directly, although some authors believe they have found evidence in favor of its existence. It has also been simulated twice in model systems that provide condensed-matter analogues of the relativistic phenomenon. The first example, in 2010, placed a trapped ion in an environment such that the non-relativistic Schrödinger equation for the ion had the same mathematical form as the Dirac equation (although the physical situation is different). Then, in 2013, it was simulated in a setup with Bose–Einstein condensates.

Other proposals for condensed-matter analogues include semiconductor nanostructures, graphene and topological insulators.

See also
 Casimir effect
 Lamb shift

References

Further reading

External links 
 Zitterbewegung in New Scientist
 Geometric Algebra in Quantum Mechanics

Quantum field theory